Patrick Delany may refer to:

Patrick Delany (theologian) (1686–1768), Irish clergyman
Patrick Bernard Delany (1845–?), American electrician and inventor
Patrick Delany (archbishop), Archbishop of Hobart, Tasmania
Patrick Delany (New Jersey politician), former member of the New Jersey General Assembly

See also
Pat Delaney (disambiguation)